This is a list of Bangladeshi women Twenty20 International cricketers. Overall, 36 players have represented the Bangladeshi national women's cricket team in Twenty20 International (T20I) cricket starting from their inaugural match in 2012. A Twenty20 International is an international cricket match between two representative teams, each having Twenty20 International status, as determined by the International Cricket Council (ICC). A Twenty20 International is played under the rules of Twenty20 cricket. This list includes all players who have played at least one T20I match and is initially arranged in the order of debut appearance. Where more than one player won their first cap in the same match, those players are initially listed alphabetically at the time of debut.

Key

List of players
Statistics are correct as of 21 February 2023.

See also
 List of Bangladesh women ODI cricketers

References

 
Bangladesh
Women T20